Statistics of Bahraini Premier League for the 1993–94 season.

Overview
East Riffa Club won the championship.

References
RSSSF

Bahraini Premier League seasons
Bah
1993–94 in Bahraini football